Ned McHenry is an Australian rules footballer who plays for the Adelaide Crows in the Australian Football League (AFL). He was recruited by the Adelaide Crows with the 16th draft pick in the 2018 AFL draft.

Early Football
McHenry played for the Geelong Falcons, and later for Vic Country in the AFL Under 18 Championships.

AFL career
McHenry played 10 games in the SANFL in 2019, where he averaged 18.4 disposals. He had his best game for the year against Norwood in the semi-final where he kicked 4 goals, had 17 disposals, took 4 marks and laid 5 tackles. Despite this, he was unable to break into the main side until 2020. McHenry debuted in the 2nd round of the 2020 AFL season, against the Port Adelaide Power. In his first game, he picked up 12 disposals and kicked two behinds.

Statistics
 Statistics are correct to the end of Round 13 2021 

|-
| scope="row" style="text-align:center" | 2019
|  || 25 || 0 || — || — || — || — || — || — || — || — || — || — || — || — || — || —
|- style="background-color: #EAEAEA"
! scope="row" style="text-align:center" | 2020
|style="text-align:center;"|
| 25 || 8 || 0 || 4 || 31 || 43 || 74 || 17 || 23 || 0.0 || 0.5 || 3.9 || 5.4 || 9.3 || 2.1 || 2.9
|- 
|- 
|scope="row" style="text-align:center" | 2021
|style="text-align:center;"|
| 25 || 12 || 6 || 3 || 59 || 84 || 143 || 24 || 39 || 0.5 || 0.2 || 4.9 || 7.0 || 11.9 || 2.0 || 3.2
|-style="background:#EAEAEA; font-weight:bold; width:2em"
| scope="row" text-align:center class="sortbottom" colspan=3 | Career
| 20
| 6
| 7
| 90
| 127
| 217
| 41
| 62
| 0.3
| 0.3
| 4.5
| 6.3
| 10.8
| 2.0
| 3.1
|}

References

External links

2000 births
Living people
Adelaide Football Club players
Australian rules footballers from Melbourne
Geelong Falcons players
Adelaide Football Club (SANFL) players
People educated at Geelong College